The 1914 United States Senate election in California was held on November 6, 1914. Incumbent Republican Senator George Clement Perkins did not run for re-election.

In a three-way race, Democratic former Mayor of San Francisco James Duval Phelan defeated Progressive attorney Francis J. Heney and Republican U.S. Representative Joseph R. Knowland.

Candidates
Francis J. Heney (Progressive), former Attorney General for the Arizona Territory
James Duval Phelan (Democratic), former Mayor of San Francisco
Joseph R. Knowland (Republican), U.S. Representative from Oakland
Ernest Untermann (Socialist), nominee for Governor of Idaho in 1908
Frederick F. Wheeler (Prohibition), nominee for California's 7th congressional district in 1902

General election

Results

See also 
  1914 United States Senate elections

References 

1914 California elections
California
1914